This is a list of Justice Ministers of Denmark, 1848–present.

List of Justice ministers (1848–present)

Justice ministers under Frederick VII (1848–1863)

Justice ministers under Christian IX (1863–1906)

Justice ministers under Frederik VIII (1906–1912)

Justice ministers under Christian X (1912–1947)

|-style="text-align:center;"
| colspan=8|No Danish government.Office is assumed by the permanent secretary.

Justice ministers under Frederik IX (1947–1972)

Justice ministers under Margrethe II (1972–present)

 According to the data provided above, Helga Pedersen was the first female to serve as the Minister of Justice in Denmark.

See also

 Justice ministry
 Politics of Denmark

Notes

References

Sources

The Danish Ministry of Justice
Lists of Danish governments since 1848

Justice Ministers